Giuseppe Gandini (18 March 1900 – 15 October 1989) was an Italian footballer who played as a midfielder. He represented the Italy national football team six times, the first being on 14 June 1925, the occasion of a friendly match against Spain in a 1–0 away loss.

References

1900 births
1989 deaths
Italian footballers
Italy international footballers
Association football midfielders
U.S. Alessandria Calcio 1912 players